Matador is a wooden toy set. The bricks are held together using special wooden sticks.

The blocks are precision cut to a single size and shape and are held together with sticks, which assists in the stability of larger constructions. The standard distance between brick holes is 20mm. The blocks are not varnished or treated.

The set has been invented by the Austrian engineer Johann Korbuly.

External links
Matador Website - German

Toy brands
Wooden toys
Construction toys